Helmut Christoferus Calabrese (born 1957) is a German-born composer and poet who immigrated to the U.S. in 1962. He trained at the Philadelphia College of Performing Arts and at New York University and is one of the founders of the music publishers Calabrese Brothers Music, LLC. His song, "The Most Beautiful Lady in the World: Statue of Liberty Anthem", was the subject of two bills in the New Jersey Legislature and the United States House of Representatives calling on the United States Congress to designate it as the official anthem of the Statue of Liberty. It was described by the Philadelphia Inquirer as, "The music sounds like a love ballad, but the lyrics are a flag waving salute to America", and was performed at Liberty State Park in July 1986 as part of the Statue of Liberty centennial celebration.

Compositions

Instrumental music
 Seeking for Solo Drumset, 2009, dedicated to Peter Jarvis, 5 minutes duration
 Time for Solo Clarinet in B flat, 2008, 8 minutes in duration
 Mudgrave for Marimba and Vibraphone, 2007, dedicated to Peter Jarvis, 5 minutes in duration
 Love's Tango for Orchestra, 2007, 3 minutes in duration
 Tears of Love for Orchestra, 2007, 3 minutes in duration
 A Little Night Music for Solo Timpani, 2005, dedicated to Peter Jarvis, 10 minutes duration
 There Is Love for Solo Piano, 2005, 3 minutes
 Easter Praises for String Quartet, 1994, 16 minutes in duration
 Vice Versus for Cello and Double Bass, 1992, 10 minutes in duration
 Band AIDS for Oboe and Violoncello, 1987, 7 minutes in duration
 XLM for Solo Alto Saxophone, 1987, Saxophone, 6 minutes in duration
 Five Answers: Cat's Cradle for Brass Quintet, 1987, 2 Trumpets, French Hn., Trombone, and Tuba, 15 min.
 Being for Solo Flute, 1986, 4 minutes in duration
 Folk Songs for Solo Piano, 1986, 7 minutes in duration
 Fugue I for Oboe, Clarinet, Bassoon, and Horn in F, 1984, 7 minutes in duration
 A Song for Piano and Violin, 1981, 4 minutes in duration
 The Struggle for Solo Piano, 1980, 10 minutes in duration
 Senza Resolto for Three Trumpets, 1980, 3 minutes in duration
 Contrapuntal Suite for Woodwind Trio, 1979, 12 minutes in duration
 Brass Septet, 1978, 8 minutes in duration
 Brass Sextet, 1978, 7 minutes in duration
 Esss for Orchestra, 1978, 10 minutes in duration
 Five Pieces for Orchestra, 1978, 10 minutes in duration
 Phantasie for Clarinet, Two Pianos, and Percussion, 1977, 8 minutes in duration
 Tone for Solo Tuba, 1977, 7 minutes in duration
 New Music for Four Trumpets, Horn in F, Piano, and Two Percussionists, 7 minutes in durations
 Orchestral Variations for String Orchestra, 1977, 7 minutes in duration
 Six Studies for Piano and Violin, 1977, 12 minutes in duration
 Flute Solo I, 1976, 5 minutes in duration
 Prelude II for Piano, 1975, 3 minutes in duration
 Prelude I for Piano, 1975, 3 minutes in duration

Vocal music
 Praise the Lord, SATB, 2009, 3 minutes in duration
 For the Lord Hath Chosen Sion, 2007, 3 minutes in duration
 Ave Maria, for voice and piano, 2003
 Elephant Song, a children's song, for voice and piano, 2003
 On Christmas Day, words by Paul L. Calabrese, 2003, 3 minutes in duration
 Songs of Age, setting the W.B. Yeats poems: Three Things, 2003, When You Are Old, 1981, and The Old Men Admiring Themselves in the Water, 1981, 12 minutes in duration
 Divine Mercy, A Hymn, 1997, 4 minutes in duration
 Flowers that Cry for Tenor or Soprano, Clarinet in Bb, and Piano, words by H. C. Calabrese, 1987, 7 minutes
 Lisa and Joey, words by Paul L. Calabrese, 1986, 3 minutes in duration
 America the Great, words by Paul L. Calabrese, 1986, 3 minutes in duration
 The Most Beautiful Lady in the World, words by Paul L. Calabrese, 1985, 3 minutes in duration
 Honey and Salt, four songs for Soprano, words by Carl Sandberg, 1980, 12 minutes in duration
 Anniversary Sketches: Four Comic Studies for Coloratura Soprano and Chamber Orchestra, 1980, 15 minutes
 The Pearl, One-act opera based on the novella by John Steinbeck, 1979, libretto by H. C. Calabrese, 1979, 1 hour

Arrangements for vocal music
 America the Beautiful, for High Voice, words by Katherine L. Bates and music by Samuel A. Ward, 2001, 4 minutes in duration
 I Believe in You, A Song for Soprano, words and music by H. Alexander Murphy, 2001, 3 minutes in duration
 I Don't Need Roses, A Song for Soprano, words and music by H. Alexander Murphy, 2001, 3 minutes in duration

Film music

2019
· Cross, (short) Dir. Vincent Miller
· Strays, (short) Dir. Jaylin Pressley, 
· The Third Date (short), Dir. Ajit Dia (In Progress), 
· Caretaker (short), Dir. Ashley McCann and Guillermo Aeizaga,  
· Sentieri Sulle Acque (feature film), Dir. Francesco Russo, Master Movies, S.r.l. (In Progress)

2018

· The Lost Boys (short), Dir. Randy Memoli
· Santa Maria (short), Dir. Dean Chen
· Composition No. 20 (animation short), Dir. Emma Foo, 
· Lemming (short), Dir. Ajit Dias, 
· Casereccio (short), Dir. Stephen Peiris, 
· Coming Home (short), Dir. Matthew Jenkins, Matthew Jenkins Productions, 
· Kakuri (short ), Dir. Kaila Shields, McFadden Production,

2012

· West End (Trailer), Dir. Joe Basile, Joe Basile Productions

2010

· Il Gioco È Fatto? (feature film), Dir. Francesco Russo, Master Movies, S.r.l., 2011 Terra di Siena International Film Festival "Best First Work" Award and 2012 Garden State Film Festival Award for "Best Traditional Music"

2006

· Mudgrave at the Beach, (short film), Dir. Nic Pearson, Matthew Krist Productions, 
· Paper People (short film),
· Butterflies (short documentary)

2019
· New Creation: Collected Poems 1975-2019

Notes and references 

 “… despre emoţia intâlnirii cu muzicianul Dinu Ghezzo,” July 15, 2012
 Delaney, Bonnie, "AN ODE TO LADY LIBERTY Brothers' Composition has patriotism at its heart", Asbury Park Press, May 29, 2004, p. 5
 Delaney, Bonnie, "Brothers' Composition has patriotism at its heart", Asbury Park Press, June 2, 2004, p. 11
 State of New Jersey, Assembly Concurrent Resolution No. 126, 210th Legislature, September 12, 2002. Synopsis: Calls on Congress to designate "The Most Beautiful Lady in the World-Statue of Liberty Anthem" as official anthem of Statue of Liberty
 State of New Jersey, Senate Concurrent Resolution No. 70, September 19, 2002. Synopsis: Calls on Congress to designate "The Most Beautiful Lady in the World-Statue of Liberty Anthem" as official anthem of Statue of Liberty.
 State of New Jersey, Assembly Concurrent Resolution No. 147, February 24, 2004. Synopsis: Calls on Congress to designate "The Most Beautiful Lady in the World-Statue of Liberty Anthem" as official anthem of Statue of Liberty

External links
 Helmut Calabrese Website
 Helmut Calabrese Music at Soundcloud.com
 
 Calabrese Brothers Music, LLC
 IMDb

American male composers
21st-century American composers
1957 births
Living people
University of the Arts (Philadelphia) alumni
New York University alumni
21st-century American male musicians